Todor Vladimirov (21 May 1895 – 23 January 1978) was a Bulgarian footballer. He competed in the men's tournament at the 1924 Summer Olympics.

References

1895 births
1978 deaths
Bulgarian footballers
Bulgaria international footballers
Olympic footballers of Bulgaria
Footballers at the 1924 Summer Olympics
Footballers from Sofia
Association football forwards
PFC Slavia Sofia players